The George J. Kempf House is a privately owned residential house located at 212 East Kilbuck Street in the city of Tecumseh in Lenawee County, Michigan.  It was designated as a Michigan State Historic State and listed on the National Register of Historic Places on August 13, 1986.  It is located just around the corner from the Joseph E. Hall House.

History
The house was built in 1905 by architect George Kempf and embodies a mix of Colonial Revival, Late Victorian, and Queen Anne Style architecture.  It is significant on the local level as a stylish turn-of-the-century, two-story house.  George Kempf lived in the house, and he and his brother Henry built many local homes in Tecumseh around this time.

Description
The Kempf House is a low, asymmetrical, two-story structure with an irregular plan. It has a hipped roof with additional gables and three dormers in the front. The central dormer contains two windows along with a triangular sunburst design in the gable peak; the smaller dormers to each side echo the decorative elements of the central dormer. The house is covered with clapboard. The front also contains a large porch with Tuscan columns.

References

Houses in Lenawee County, Michigan
Houses on the National Register of Historic Places in Michigan
Queen Anne architecture in Michigan
Colonial Revival architecture in Michigan
Victorian architecture in Michigan
Michigan State Historic Sites
Houses completed in 1905
National Register of Historic Places in Lenawee County, Michigan
Tecumseh, Michigan
1905 establishments in Michigan